"Real Love" is a song by American singer Mary J. Blige from her debut studio album, What's the 411? (1992). Based on real life experiences, it was written and produced by Cory Rooney and Mark Morales, and samples Audio Two's 1987 song "Top Billin'". The song was issued as the album's second single on July 28, 1992. It became Blige's first top-10 hit, peaking at number seven on the US Billboard Hot 100. It also topped the Billboard Hot R&B/Hip-Hop Songs and Rhythmic charts and was certified Gold by the Recording Industry Association of America (RIAA) on November 4, 1992. Rolling Stone included "Real Love" in their list of "500 Best Songs of All Time" in 2021 at number 327.

Background
The initial creation of this song started with Morales writing the lyrics in a studio. According to Rooney, he started singing the first few lines and Rooney liked its hint of rap. Rooney added a bridge and a melody. Regarding the song's meaning, Rooney said, "Mary J. Blige is the female that’s from the hood that sings the pain of all of the females from the hood. At that point in her life, she was being taken advantage of by a lot of the industry cats and a song like ‘Real Love’ described her situation."

Critical reception
In an retrospective review, Daryl McIntosh from Albumism noted that "the sped-up baseline" of Audio Two's "Top Billin'", "provided the perfect head-nodding cadence for Blige's soulful exploration of her Mr. Right." Stanton Swihart from AllMusic stated that songs like "Real Love" "are and will remain timeless slices of soul even after their trendiness has worn off". The Daily Vault's Mark Millan described it as an "upbeat love song that the young Blige revels in singing". He added that "it still gets a rousing response when she dusts it off during gigs." In his weekly UK chart commentary, James Masterton said that "it's not commercial enough to be a major hit". James Hamilton from Music Weeks RM Dance Update viewed it as "En Vogue-ish". Parry Gettelman from Orlando Sentinel felt the beat made the song "listenable enough". Jonathan Bernstein from Spin complimented its "irresistible bounce".

Music video

The official music video for the song was directed by American film and music video director Marcus Raboy.

Impact and legacy
In 2021, Rolling Stone included "Real Love" in their list of "500 Best Songs of All Time" at number 327. In 2022, Pitchfork ranked it at number 39 in their list of "The 250 Best Songs of the 1990s". Mary J Blige's song still holds its impacts today as she's set to produce a Lifetime movie on "Real Love."

Track listings

 US cassette and 7-inch single
 "Real Love" (album version) – 4:30
 "Real Love" (hip-hop version) – 4:30

 US maxi-CD and maxi-cassette single
 "Real Love" (album version) – 4:30
 "Real Love" (hip-hop mix) – 5:00
 "Real Love" (acapella version) – 3:32
 "Real Love" (hip-hop club mix) – 4:40
 "Real Love" (instrumental) – 4:38

 European CD single
 "Real Love" (radio version) – 4:10
 "Real Love" (album version) – 4:30
 "What's the 411?" (album version) – 4:13
 "Real Love" (hip-hop club mix) – 4:40

 UK 7-inch single (1992)
 "Real Love" (album version) – 4:30
 "Real Love" (hip-hop mix) – 5:00

 UK 12-inch and CD single (1992)
 "Real Love" (album version) – 4:30
 "Real Love" (hip-hop mix) – 4:40
 "Real Love" (The Fresh N' Funky mix) – 4:29
 "Real Love" (The Talkin' Love mix) – 4:27

 UK cassette single (1993)
 "Real Love" (Brixton Flavour 7-inch) (Without Rap) – 3:55
 "Real Love" (original UK 7-inch) – 4:10

 UK CD single (1993)
 "Real Love" (Brixton Flavour 7-inch) (Without Rap) – 3:55
 "Real Love" (original UK 7-inch) – 4:10
 "Real Love" (Brixton Flavour 12-inch) – 6:06
 "Real Love" (Blacksmith's Summer Sound 12-inch) – 6:22
 "Real Love" (West End (A.W.M.) mix) – 5:13
 "Real Love" (hip-hop club mix) – 4:40
 "Real Love" (acapella) – 3:40

 UK 12-inch single – Version 1 (1993)
 "Real Love" (Brixton Flavour 12-inch) – 6:06
 "Real Love" (West End (A.W.M.) mix) – 5:13
 "Real Love" (Blacksmith's Summer Sound 12-inch) – 6:22
 "Real Love" (hip-hop club mix) – 4:40
 "Real Love" (acapella) – 3:40

 UK 12-inch single – Version 2 (1993)
 "Real Love" (Phat remix) – 4:59
 "Real Love" (album version) – 4:30
 "I Don't Want to Do Anything" (duet with K-Ci Hailey) (album version) – 5:50
 "Love No Limit" (Puff Daddy remix) – 3:57

Credits and personnel
Credits adapted from the What's the 411? liner notes.

 Cory Rooney – producer
 Mark Morales – producer
 Sean Combs – executive producer
 Charlie Davis – executive producer
 Kurt Woodley – executive producer

Charts

Weekly charts

Year-end charts

Certifications

Release history

Toby Lightman version

In 2004, American pop rock singer-songwriter Toby Lightman covered "Real Love" and included it as the closing track on the re-release of her debut studio album Little Things. The song was issued as the third and final single from the album; and it peaked at No. 35 on the Billboard'' top 40 chart.

Music video

The official music video for the song was directed by Charles Jensen.

Charts

See also
 List of number-one R&B singles of 1992 (U.S.)

References

External links
 
 

1991 songs
1992 singles
2004 singles
Lava Records singles
Mary J. Blige songs
MCA Records singles
Music videos directed by Marcus Raboy
Song recordings produced by Prince Markie Dee
Song recordings produced by Cory Rooney
Songs written by Prince Markie Dee
Songs written by L.A. Reid
Toby Lightman songs
Uptown Records singles
The Notorious B.I.G. songs